A motorcycle is a single-track two-wheeled motor vehicle.  It is also known as a motorbike.

Motorcycle may also refer to:
 Motor Cycle (magazine), a UK publication from 1962, previously named The Motor Cycle
 Motor Cycle Weekly (magazine), a UK publication from 1977, previously named Motor Cycle and The Motor Cycle
 Motorcycle Mechanics (magazine), a UK publication from 1959
 Electric motorcycles and scooters, vehicles with two or three wheels that use electric motors to attain locomotion
 Moped, a class of low-powered motorized vehicles, generally with two wheels
 Motorized bicycle, a bicycle with an attached motor used to assist with pedalling
 Motorized scooter, a vehicle consisting of a footboard mounted on two wheels and a long steering handle, propelled by a small motor
 Motorized tricycle, similar to a motorcycle, but with three wheels
 Motor scooter, a two-wheeled motorized vehicle with a step-through frame
 Motorcycles (film), a 1949 Czech film
 Gabriel & Dresden's trance act formed by the duo and Jes Brieden
  Motorcycle, a song by the Devonshire band The Rumble Strips
 MotorCycle, a 1993 album by rock band Daniel Amos
 Motor-Cycle (album), an album by Lotti Golden on Atlantic Records

See also 
 Bicycle